The Clarendon Commission was a royal commission established in 1861 to investigate the state of nine leading schools in England, in the wake of complaints about the finances, buildings, and management of Eton College. It was chaired by George Villiers, 4th Earl of Clarendon. The commission sat until 1864, when its report was published with general recommendations on questions of curriculum and governance. The Clarendon Report gives a detailed picture of life in the nine schools. As a consequence of its publication, the Public Schools Act was passed in 1868.

Scope
The commission's terms of reference were: "To inquire into the nature and application of the Endowments, Funds and Revenue belonging to or received by the hereinafter mentioned Colleges, Schools and Foundations; and also to inquire into the administration and management of the said Colleges, Schools and Foundations". The nine schools comprised seven boarding schools (Eton, Charterhouse, Harrow, Rugby, Shrewsbury, Westminster, and Winchester) and two day schools (St Paul's and Merchant Taylors'). However, the 1868 act concerned itself only with the seven boarding schools.

In the concluding paragraphs of the report, fulsome praise was given to the nine schools:

See also

 George Villiers, 4th Earl of Clarendon

References

Footnotes

Bibliography

 
 
 

1861 establishments in the United Kingdom
1861 in education
British Royal Commissions
Education in England